Rumah means "house" or "home" in the Indonesian language. It may also refer to:

 Rumah Gadang, the traditional house of Minangkabau people, Indonesia
 Rumah Lanting, the traditional house of Kalimantan, Indonesia
 Rumah, Riyadh, a governorate and city in Riyadh Region, Saudi Arabia
 Rumah, a weekly Indonesian house tabloid